Tsuyoshi Yokoyama (born June 29, 1983), better known as  is a Japanese kickboxer who competes in the welterweight division. He comes from a Seidokaikan karate background and is known for his unorthodox kicks.

Biography and career
Yamamoto began practicing karate at the age of 13. His brother Shingo Yokoyama is also a kickboxer. In 2003 he became the 5th All Japan Seidokaikan Lightweight Champion.

He made his professional kickboxing debut on August 16, 2008, when he defeated Marcelo Nascimento by a unanimous decision. In his following fight he made his debut in the K-1 promotion at 'the K-1 World MAX 2009 World Championship Tournament Final 8 and was knocked out by Jae Gil Noh. Following this he went on an eight fight unbeaten run consisting of seven wins and one draw. He returned to K-1 in a tournament reserve match at K-1 World MAX 2011 -70kg Japan Tournament Final on September 25, 2011. He defeated Yoshi via a unanimous decision.

Titles
 5th Seido Kaikan All Japan Lightweight Champion (2003)

Kickboxing record

|-
|
|Win
|align=left| Yoshi
|K-1 World MAX 2011 -70kg Japan Tournament Final
|Osaka, Japan
|Decision (unanimous)
|3
|3:00
|9-1-1
|
|-
|
|Win
|align=left| Kimuisaku
|Gladiator 21
|Japan
|KO (left hook to the body)
|1
|2:27
|8-1-1
|
|-
|
|Win
|align=left| Yusuke Fukuda
|HEAT 18
|Osaka, Japan
|Decision (Unanimous)
|3
|3:00
|7-1-1
|
|-
|
|Win
|align=left| Takeshi Yoshitsugu
|ACCEL: Heavyweight Tournament Opening Round
|Japan
|KO (right hook)
|2
| -
|6-1-1
|
|-
|
|style="background: #c5d2ea"|Draw
|align=left| Kosuke Yamauchi
|Sengoku: Soul of Fight
|Tokyo, Japan
|Decision draw
|3
|3:00
|5-1-1
|
|-
|
|Win
|align=left| Courage
|Legend 1: Land of Fire
|Japan
|TKO
|3
|0:29
|5-1
|
|-
|
|Win
|align=left| Shingo Takayama
|Gladiator 11
|Japan
|Decision (split)
|3
|3:00
|4-1
|
|-
|
|Win
|align=left|
|Gladiator 6
|Japan
|TKO (corner stoppage)
|2
|2:29
|3-1
|
|-
|
|Win
|align=left| Munjefun
|Gladiator Okayama: Japan-Korea Friendship
|Okayama, Japan
|Decision (unanimous)
|3
|3:00
|2-1
|
|-
|
|Loss
|align=left| Jae Gil Noh
|K-1 World MAX 2009 World Championship Tournament Final 8
|Tokyo, Japan
|KO (straight right)
|3
|2:01
|1-1
|
|-
|
|Win
|align=left| Marcelo Nascimento
|Gladiator: Korea Friendship International Martial Arts Tournament
|Japan
|Decision (unanimous)
|3
|3:00
|1-0
|
|-
|-
| colspan=10 | Legend:

References

External links
 K-1 Profile

1983 births
Living people
Japanese male kickboxers
Welterweight kickboxers
Japanese male karateka
Sportspeople from Hyōgo Prefecture